"Party Up (Up in Here)" is a song by American  rapper DMX, released as the second single from his third album ... And Then There Was X (1999) and as of 2020 his most successful single (in the US). There are three versions of the song: an explicit/album version; a censored album version, and a radio/video edit version. It was nominated for the Grammy Award for Best Rap Solo Performance but lost to Eminem's "The Real Slim Shady".

The song was voted number 56 on VH1's 100 Greatest Songs of the '00s. It was listed at No. 388 on Rolling Stone's "Top 500 Greatest Songs of All Time" in 2021.

Music video
The music video depicts DMX as being caught up in a case of mistaken identity at a bank holdup. The video premiered on the week of April 3, 2000. It has over 136 million views on YouTube as of October 2021. The video was shot at the Frost Bank building on Market Street in Galveston, Texas.

In media and sports

"Party Up" is used by Perfecto Bundy, a Chilean wrestler, as his entrance song.

The 1999-2000 Los Angeles Lakers were seen singing the song’s hook after their series-clinching win over the Indiana Pacers in the 2000 NBA Finals.

The song is played at Lincoln Financial Field, at every Philadelphia Eagles home game, everytime the Philadelphia Eagles score a touchdown and is also used at Dodger Stadium, at every Los Angeles Dodgers home game, when they hit a home run and T-Mobile Park when the Seattle Mariners hit a home run as well.

Electronic Arts licensed the track for the 2003 sports video game Tiger Woods PGA Tour 2004, where it plays as an intro.

Charts

Weekly charts

Year-end charts

Certifications

References

2000 songs
2000 singles
DMX (rapper) songs
Ruff Ryders Entertainment singles
Def Jam Recordings singles
Song recordings produced by Swizz Beatz
Songs written by Swizz Beatz
Music videos directed by Dave Meyers (director)
Songs written by DMX (rapper)